is a railway station on the Ban'etsu West Line in the town of Nishiaizu, Yama District, Fukushima Prefecture,  Japan, operated by East Japan Railway Company (JR East).

Lines

Station layout
Onobori Station has one side platform serving a single bi-directional track. The station is unattended.

History
Onobori Station opened on November 1, 1955. The station was absorbed into the JR East network upon the privatization of the Japanese National Railways (JNR) on April 1, 1987.

Surrounding area
The station is located in an isolated rural area surrounded by fields.

See also
 List of railway stations in Japan

External links

 JR East Station information 

Railway stations in Fukushima Prefecture
Ban'etsu West Line
Railway stations in Japan opened in 1955
Nishiaizu, Fukushima